Akkalkuwa Assembly constituency is one of the 288 Vidhan Sabha constituencies of Maharashtra state in western India. This constituency is located in the Nandurbar district and it is reserved for the candidates belonging to the Scheduled tribes. It is currently held by Adv. K. C. Padvi of the INC, who is currently Cabinet Minister for Tribal Affairs .

It is part of the Nandurbar Lok Sabha constituency along with another five Vidhan Sabha segments, namely Shahada, Nandurbar and Navapur in the Nandurbar district and Sakri and Shirpur in the Dhule district.

As per orders of Delimitation of Parliamentary and Assembly constituencies Order, 2008, No. 1 Akkalkuwa Assembly constituency is composed of the following: 1. Akkalkuwa Tehsil and 2. Akrani Tehsil of Nandurbar district.

Members of Legislative Assembly

Election results

Assembly Elections 2019

Assembly Elections 2014

2009

See also
 List of constituencies of Maharashtra Vidhan Sabha

References

Assembly constituencies of Maharashtra
Nandurbar district